Tereza Radová (born 22 November 2001) is a Czech ice hockey player and member of the Czech national ice hockey team, currently playing in the Swedish Women's Hockey League (SDHL) with Leksands IF Dam.

Playing career
Radová made her senior national team debut at the 2021 IIHF Women's World Championship, scoring her first national team goal against  in the preliminary round. At the Olympic qualification for the women's ice hockey tournament at the 2022 Winter Olympics, she helped the Czech Republic qualify to participate in the Olympic Games for the first time in team history. As a junior player with the Czech national under-18 team, she participated in the 2019 IIHF World Women's U18 Championship.

Radová has also played in the Czech national junior leagues with the under-16 and under-17 teams of HC Olomouc and in the Czech Women's Extraliga with SK Karviná.

References

External links
 
 Tereza Radová at Hokej.cz 

Living people
2001 births
Ball hockey players
Czech expatriate ice hockey players in Sweden
Czech women's ice hockey defencemen
Ice hockey players at the 2022 Winter Olympics
Göteborg HC players
Leksands IF Dam players
Olympic ice hockey players of the Czech Republic
People from Svitavy
Sportspeople from the Pardubice Region